Here's to Taking It Easy is the fifth full-length album by Phosphorescent. It is his third on the Dead Oceans label. It was released on May 11, 2010.

Track listing
"It's Hard to Be Humble (When You're from Alabama)" - 4:28
"Nothing Was Stolen (Love Me Foolishly)" - 4:49
"We'll Be Here Soon" - 3:17
"The Mermaid Parade" - 4:22
"I Don't Care if There's Cursing" - 4:55
"Tell Me Baby (Have You Had Enough)" - 4:37
"Hej, Me I'm Light" - 4:38
"Heaven, Sittin' Down" - 4:26
"Los Angeles" - 8:48

Charts

References

2010 albums
Phosphorescent (band) albums
Dead Oceans albums